This is a list of members of the Victorian Legislative Assembly, from the elections of 23 February 1883 to the elections of 5 March 1886. Victoria was a British self-governing colony in Australia at the time.

 Note the "Term in Office" refers to that member's term(s) in the Assembly, not necessarily for that electorate.

 Bolton resigned in April 1884; replaced by George Graham, sworn-in June 1884.
 Bowman resigned in December 1885; replaced by Alfred Richard Outtrim the same month.
 Francis died 25 January 1884; replaced by John Murray, sworn-in June 1884.
 McColl died 2 April 1885; replaced by John Moore Highett, sworn-in July 1885.
 MacGregor died 18 September 1883; replaced by David Gaunson, sworn-in October 1883.
 Orkney resigned October 1885; replaced by Godfrey Carter, sworn-in November 1885
 Grant died 1 April 1885; replaced by George Enright Bourchier, sworn-in June 1885.

References

Members of the Parliament of Victoria by term
19th-century Australian politicians